Reuben Robie House is a historic home located at Bath in Steuben County, New York.  It was built by Reuben Robie in 1847 and is a 2-story, center-hall Greek Revival–style brick dwelling.  The small flat-roofed entrance portico supported by Doric columns was added about 1900.  Also on the property is a -story board-and-batten carriage house and a toolshed.  It was home to Congressman Reuben Robie (1799–1872).

It was listed on the National Register of Historic Places in 1983.

References

Houses on the National Register of Historic Places in New York (state)
Greek Revival houses in New York (state)
Houses completed in 1847
Houses in Steuben County, New York
1847 establishments in New York (state)
National Register of Historic Places in Steuben County, New York